Mearns may refer to:

 Mearns, Alberta, Canada
 Newton Mearns, East Renfrewshire, Scotland
 Mearns Castle, a 15th-century tower house in Newton Mearns
 Mearns Castle High School, Newton Mearns
 Mearns Primary School, Newton Mearns
 Kincardineshire, a county in Scotland also known as the Mearns
 Mearns Academy, Laurencekirk, Aberdeenshire, Scotland
 Mearns FM, a community-run radio station in northeast Scotland
 Mearns (surname)

See also
Chihuahuan grasshopper mouse or Mearns's grasshopper mouse
Máel Petair of Mearns
Mearns's flying fox, a species of bat endemic to the Philippines
Mearns's pouched mouse, a species of rodent in Ethiopia, Kenya, Somalia, Tanzania, and Uganda
Mearns's squirrel, a species of squirrel native to Mexico
Montezuma quail or Mearns quail